A Dalek is a member of a race of aliens in Doctor Who media.

Dalek or Daleks may also refer to:

Doctor Who
 The Daleks, a 1963–64 serial of Doctor Who
 Doctor Who: The Daleks, the soundtrack featuring music from the serial
 "The Daleks", a 1964 episode of the Doctor Who serial The Dalek Invasion of Earth
 "Dalek", a 2005 episode of Doctor Who

Other uses
Dalek (artist) (born 1968 as James Marshall), American artist
Dälek, a hip hop duo from New Jersey
Daleks (video game) or Robots
Bridgewater Place or the Dalek, a skyscraper in Leeds, England 
Dalek, a BBC Two ident

See also

Kaled, the Dalek progenitor species from Doctor Who
Dahlak Archipelago, an island group in the Red Sea
Dahlik language, a language spoken in Eritrea and the Dahlak islands
Dalet, a letter of the Hebrew alphabet
Robert Dallek, American historian